The Huwood Power Loader  was mechanical device of roughly 6 ft by 2 ft by 1 ft dimensions and powered by a 10 hp engine, used to move cut coal from the coal face on to the conveyor.  The machine was equipped with winches which used haulage ropes to drag the machine along the coal face and used both horizontal and rotary motions to shift the coal onto the conveyor. Pleasley Colliery, Derbyshire introduced one of the first such loaders in 1950.

See also 
Meco-Moore Cutter Loader
Anderton Shearer

References 

Mining equipment